Giordano De Giorgi (15 February 1919 – 27 February 1996) was an Italian wrestler. He competed in the men's freestyle flyweight at the 1952 Summer Olympics.

References

External links
 

1919 births
1996 deaths
Italian male sport wrestlers
Olympic wrestlers of Italy
Wrestlers at the 1952 Summer Olympics
Sportspeople from the Province of Teramo